Guambiano or Misak are an indigenous people of the department of Cauca in Colombia. Their language is known as Guambiano and is one of the Coconucan languages. The majority lives in the western part of the Colombian Andes range (Cordillera). Some Guambiano can be also found in Huila Department.

The Misak society has a patriarchal kinship system, with hereditary offices, descent lines, and property passing through the male line. Agriculture is the base of their economy. Coffee, cassava, potatoes, beans, and cabbage are among the main products they cultivate.

The Guambiano people are known for their traditional clothing: blue scarf (worn as a sarong), rectangular ponchos, and black bowler hat for the men; black skirt, solid color top, blue scarf, and dark bowler hat for the women.

References

 Ministerio de Cultura 2010: "Misak (Guambianos), la gente del agua, del conocimiento y de los sueños". Bogotá.
 Pachón, Ximena 1987: "Guambía "; Introducción a la Colombia Amerindia: 235–248. Instituto Colombiano de Antropología; Bogotá. 
 Vásquez de Ruiz, Beatriz 1988: La predicaión en Guambiano; CCELA, Universidad de Los Andes, Bogotá. ISSN 0120-9507

Indigenous peoples in Colombia